Yaygir (also spelt Yaygirr or Yegir) is an extinct Australian Aboriginal language. It was spoken by the Yaygir people in the Northern Rivers region of New South Wales.

There are currently attempts to revitalise the language, including the publication of a dictionary in 2012.

References

Gumbaynggiric languages
Extinct languages of New South Wales
Languages extinct in the 20th century
Language revival